The 1976–77 Allsvenskan was the 43rd season of the top division of Swedish handball. 12 teams competed in the league. IK Heim won the regular season, but SoIK Hellas won the playoffs and claimed their seventh Swedish title. IFK Malmö and Västra Frölunda IF were relegated.

League table

Playoffs

Semifinals
 SoIK Hellas−GUIF 20−23, 24−18, 23−17 (SoIK Hellas advance to the finals)
 IK Heim−LUGI 19−17, 21−14 (IK Heim advance to the finals)

Finals
 SoIK Hellas−IK Heim 30−16, 19−17 (SoIK Hellas champions)

References 

Swedish handball competitions